Tahal is a village and municipality in the district of Havsa, Edirne Province, Turkey and has a population of 257.

References 

Villages in Havsa District